William Macdonald (16 November 1861 – 24 January 1941) was a Scotland international rugby union player.

Rugby Union career

Amateur career

In 1886 Macdonald was playing rugby union for the 1st Lanarkshire Rifle Volunteers.

Macdonald played for Glasgow University. He also represented the club for the Scottish Rugby Union.

He graduated with Glasgow University and at the start of the 1891 season, it was stated that he would then play for West of Scotland. This caused the Scottish Referee newspaper of 26 October 1891 to report:
They say that W. A. Macdonald will be seen permanently in the ranks of the West. Now that the 'varsity seems dead, his connection with that club as representative on the Union is a great hardship to other and more deserving clubs. Should Mr. Macdonald transfer his services to the West it will be competent for the Union, in accordance with Rule 7, to appoint another member. Mr. Macdonald, of course, would require to resign his seat and in justice to the other clubs we trust he will see it as his duty to do so.

However for the 1891 inter-city fixture Macdonald was still noted as a Glasgow University player.

Provincial career

He turned out for West of Scotland District to play against East of Scotland District while still with 1st Lanark.

He was capped by Glasgow District in the inter-city match of 1885, while with 1st Lanark. By 1889, now with Glasgow University, he was captaining the side. He was still playing in the fixture in 1890 although the captainship passed to Charles Orr.

International career

Macdonald played 3 times for Scotland.

Law career

He was a solicitor in Insch, Aberdeenshire. He became a Justice of the Peace.

After his death the goodwill of his legal business went on sale. The advert stated that it 'affords a splendid opportunity of a successful legal business being established in a wide and prosperous agricultural district of Aberdeenshire'.

Family

His father was Donald Macdonald (1811-1898), a farmer, and his mother Margaret Ross (1821-1895). He was one of their eleven children.

He married Alice Sarah Boulton (1877-1960).

Death

His cause of death was marked as arteriolosclerosis. He died on 24 January 1941 at St. Andrew's House in Insch. There was a service at St. Drostan's church and he was cremated in Aberdeen Crematorium on 27 January 1941.

References

1861 births
1941 deaths
1st Lanarkshire Rifle Volunteers RFC players
Glasgow District (rugby union) players
Glasgow University RFC players
Rugby union players from Highland (council area)
Scotland international rugby union players
Scottish rugby union players
West of Scotland District (rugby union) players
Rugby union forwards